Hamad Ali Hasan (born 1969) is a Lebanese academic and politician who has served as the Minister of Health in the Lebanese government from 21 January 2020 to 10 September 2021.

Career 
Hasan earned a masters in pharmacy (1994), a diploma in clinical laboratory sciences (1998), and a doctorate in molecular biology, all from the Moscow Medical Academy (1999). He served as the head of the Medical Laboratory Division of the al Maias Hospital Shtoura from 2000 to 2009. Hasan worked as a lecturer at the Lebanese University and the Lebanese International University from 2003 to 2014.

Hasan has served as a member of the Baalbek Municipality Council since 2010. He was the council's president from 2013 to 2016.

Notes

References 

1969 births
Living people
Health ministers of Lebanon
People from Baalbek
Academic staff of Lebanese University
Hezbollah politicians